René Canuel (born 21 October 1936 in Sainte-Odile, Quebec) was a member of the House of Commons of Canada from 1993 to 2000. He is a professor and teacher by career.

Canuel was elected in the Matapédia-Matane electoral district under the Bloc Québécois party in the 1993 and 1997 federal elections, thus serving in the 35th and 36th Canadian Parliaments. Canuel left Canadian politics in 2000 as he did not seek a third term in that year's federal election.

Electoral record

References
 

1936 births
Living people
Bloc Québécois MPs
French Quebecers
Members of the House of Commons of Canada from Quebec
People from Bas-Saint-Laurent